Eugatha is a monotypic moth genus of the family Noctuidae. Its only species, Eugatha thermochroa, is found in New Guinea and the Australian state of Queensland. Both the genus and species were first described by George Hampson in 1911.

References

Acontiinae
Monotypic moth genera